Quality Distribution, Inc. (Quality) is a Tampa, Florida-based trucking and chemical transportation business. On August 18, 2015, Quality completed its previously announced merger agreement with funds advised by Apax Partners LLP on May 6, 2015.

History
Formerly known as MTL, Inc. the company was founded in 1984 and had its name changed to Quality Distribution, Inc. in 1999. By 2012 the company was managing a fleet of approximately 2,800 independently owned and operated tractors and 5,300 trailers, as well as affiliate and company owned terminals; it had about 850 employees and a market capitalization of about $250 million. It expanded through acquisition into a number of areas in 2012, including transporting oil and wastewater for energy companies. These acquisitions initially underperformed expectations, but a December 2013 article in Barron's noted that QD's core business of chemical transportation remained a market-share leader. Earlier in 2013, Apollo Global Management planned to divest its 17% stake in the company with a public offering.

As of August 28, 2015, Quality no longer trades on the NASDAQ under the symbol QLTY.

Business structure
Quality operates three segments - Chemical Logistics, Intermodal, and Energy Logistics - through a number of wholly owned subsidiary companies. Chemical Logistics is operated by Quality Carriers, Inc. (“QCI”) and includes liquid and dry bulk chemicals, and bulk dry and liquid food-grade products. Intermodal is operated by Boasso America Corporation (“Boasso”) which includes ISO tank container transportation, depot services, tank cleaning, heating, testing, maintenance, and storage services. Energy Logistics is operated by QC Energy Resources, Inc. and QC Environmental Services, Inc. (collectively “QCER”) provide logistics and transportation services of crude oil, fresh water and production fluids to unconventional oil and gas (“UCO&G”) markets.

Acquisitions 
As of 2022, Quality distribution had acquired the following subsidiaries:

 American Transinurance Group. Inc. (Delaware)
 ATG Reinsurance Ltd. (Turks & Caicos Island)
 Chemical Leaman Corporation (Pennsylvania)
 EnviroPower, Inc. (Delaware)
 Fleet Transport Company, Inc. (Delaware)
 Levy Transport Ltd. / Levy Transport, LTEE
 Mexico Investments, Inc. (Florida)
 MTL De Mexico S.A. de c.v. (Mexico)

 MTL Investments, Inc. (Canada)
 MTL of Nevada (Nevada)
 Power Purchasing, Inc. (Delaware)
 QD Capital Corporation (Delaware)

 QSI Services, Inc. (Delaware)
 Quala Systems, Inc. (Delaware)
 Quality Carriers, Inc. (Illinois)
 Quality Distribution, LLC (Delaware)
 Transplastics, Inc. (Delaware)

References

External links
Quality Distribution Website
Moving Company In Sarasota

Companies based in Tampa, Florida
Companies established in 1984
Trucking companies of the United States